Robert Rae Cornthwaite (April 28, 1917 – July 20, 2006) was an American film and television character actor.

Biography
Cornthwaite was born in Saint Helens, Oregon. He said that his interest in acting began in his early teens, when he was forced to recite one line in a school play.

He began his acting career in 1937, appearing in a college production of Twelfth Night, while attending Reed College in Portland, Oregon.

In the late 1930s, he enrolled in Long Beach City College and worked at radio stations in Southern California. He earned a degree from the University of Southern California after serving as an intelligence officer in the Army Air Force during World War II.

Cornthwaite began his time in the US Army Air Force as a radio-gunner in B-25 aircraft as part of the 12th Medium Bombardment Group in 1942. He then served as a radio operator and superintendent of the watch with the 79th Fighter Group from 1943-1944. This was followed by serving as a writer and broadcaster with the Mediterranean Allied Air Forces from 1944 until 1945. In this position he performed Public Relations duties in Naples, Rome, Corsica and other locations in the Mediterranean area. While on Corsica, Cornthwaite worked on his first film which was for the Free French Air Force. He acted as a writer and sound engineer recording Capitaine Eve Curie (daughter of Marie and Pierre Curie) of the Free French Air Force. He did the commentary in French and English. Cornthwaite also dubbed the voice of American Air Force General Ira Eaker since he did not speak any French.

Upon his return to civilian life in 1946, Cornthwaite moved to Hollywood and soon found movie work, typically portraying scientists, lawyers and other "learned types" in a number of studio productions.

In 1951, Cornthwaite was cast in Howard Hawks's production of The Thing from Another World. His character, Dr. Carrington, the unofficial leader of an Arctic polar expedition, observes the nearby crash of an unidentified flying object, and urges his military counterparts to communicate with the creature inside, even at the cost of their own lives. This performance eventually earned him entry into the "Science Fiction Hall of Fame" in 1993.

Other notable films include The War of the Worlds, What Ever Happened to Baby Jane?, Colossus: The Forbin Project and the Joe Dante production of Matinee, in which he shared screen time with fellow 1950s screen notables, William Schallert and Kevin McCarthy in the "film within a film", "MANT", a spoof of sci-fi films. Similarly, Cornthwaite appeared as Dr. Carrington opposite Ken Tobey (again as Hendry) in a spoof titled Attack of the B Movie Monster, shot in 1984. Expanded and retitled The Naked Monster, it was released on DVD in 2005 by Anthem Pictures.

Stage and television work
He remained primarily a stage actor throughout his career, and translated a number of plays from French to English.  Balancing his theater work with "bill-paying" jobs, he appeared frequently on television, including a role as naturalist John James Audubon in three episodes of the Desilu Studios Production, The Adventures of Jim Bowie, starring Scott Forbes. He appeared twice as Joe Brennan in the first Brian Keith television series, Crusader, which aired on CBS in the middle 1950s. He appeared in five episodes of CBS's Perry Mason, including the role of murderer Herbert Dean in the series' third episode in 1957, "The Case of the Nervous Accomplice", and murderer Carl Bruner in the 1962 episode, "The Case of the Ancient Romeo".

He also made appearances during the 1950s, 1960s and 1970s in such series as Perry Mason, The Untouchables, Crossroads, The Californians, Rescue 8, The Twilight Zone, The Roaring 20s, The Rifleman, Death Valley Days, Gunsmoke (in 1957 as “Lou Staley”, brother to the title character & angry killer in “Mavis McCloud”, Voyage to the Bottom of the Sea, Batman (episodes 35 and 36), The Monkees, Gidget, Laverne & Shirley, Dragnet, Combat!,  The Munsters, Laredo, Kate and Allie, and Get Smart, in which he had a semi-recurring role as CONTROL's lab scientist, Professor Windish. One of his last major stage roles was in a La Jolla Playhouse production of The Cherry Orchard opposite Lynn Redgrave. Among Cornthwaite's last television works was a recurring role as a man with Alzheimer's on the series Picket Fences.

Death
Cornthwaite's death was attributed to natural causes. He died at the Motion Picture and Television Country House and Hospital in Woodland Hills, California. He was 89.

Partial filmography

 Union Station (1950) as Emergency Room Orderly (uncredited)
 Gambling House (1950) as Stefan (uncredited)
 The Thing from Another World (1951) as Dr. Arthur Carrington
 The Mark of the Renegade (1951) as Innkeeper
 His Kind of Woman (1951) as Hernandez (uncredited)
 Something to Live For (1952) as Young Man (uncredited)
 Monkey Business (1952) as Dr. Zoldeck
 The War of the Worlds (1953) as Dr. Pryor
 Day of Triumph (1954) as Simon the Zealot
 Stranger on Horseback (1955) as Arnold Hammer
 Kiss Me Deadly (1955) as FBI Agent #1
 The Purple Mask (1955) as Napoleon Bonaparte
 The Leather Saint (1956) as Dr. Lomas
 The Spirit of St. Louis (1957) as Harry Knight, Lindbergh Student (uncredited)
 Hell on Devil's Island (1957) as Gov. Renault
 The Power of the Resurrection (1958) as Caiaphas
 Ten Seconds to Hell (1959) as Franz Loeffler
 Day of the Outlaw (1959) as Tommy Preston, Wyoming Hotel Owner
 Reptilicus (1961) as Man (voice, uncredited)
 All Hands on Deck (1961) as Naval Inspector (uncredited)
 What Ever Happened to Baby Jane? (1962) as Dr. Shelby
 The Ghost and Mr. Chicken (1966) as Lawyer Springer
 The Ride to Hangman's Tree (1967) as T.L. Harper
 Waterhole No. 3 (1967) as George, Hotel Clerk
 The Legend of Lylah Clare (1968) as Studio Photo Archivist (uncredited)
 Colossus: The Forbin Project (1970) as First Scientist
 The Peace Killers (1971) as Ben
 The Longest Night (1972) as Frank Cavanaugh
 Journey Through Rosebud (1972) as Hearing Officer
 Futureworld (1976) as Mr. Reed
 Deal of the Century (1983) as Huddleston
 Who's That Girl (1987) as Minister
 Time Trackers (1989) as Dr. Alistair Craig
 Frame Up (1991) as Earl Cott
 Matinee (1993) as Dr. Flankon (uncredited)
 The Naked Monster (2005) as Dr. Carrington (final film role)

References

External links
 
 
 
 
 

1917 births
2006 deaths
American male film actors
American male television actors
University of Southern California alumni
Reed College alumni
People from St. Helens, Oregon
Long Beach City College alumni
Male actors from Los Angeles
Male actors from Portland, Oregon
20th-century American male actors
United States Army Air Forces personnel of World War II
United States Army Air Forces officers